Nicoll Russell Studios is an architecture practice based in Dundee, Scotland.

The firm was established in 1982 by Andrew Nicoll and Ric Russell as a result of the completion of Dundee Repertory Theatre.

The Dundee Repertory Theatre received the practice's first Royal Institute of British Architects (RIBA) Award. The practice has since won a number of awards including RIBA, National Civic Trust, Dynamic Place and Royal Incorporation of Architects in Scotland (RIAS) Awards.

Projects
Among Nicoll Russell's principal projects have been Arbroath Market Place (1987), The Grianan Building, Dundee (1987), TSB Bank, St Andrews (1989), Scrimgeour's Corner, Crieff (1993), the White Top Centre, Dundee (1995), Dundee Sheriff Court (1998), the Falkirk Wheel (1999), the Byre Theatre, St Andrews (2002), Scottish Dance Theatre, Dundee (2003), An Lanntair, Stornoway (2005), Howden Park Arts Centre, Livingston (2009), and the Briggait Artists' Studios Complex, in a listed former fish market facing the River Clyde in Glasgow, for The Wasps Trust (due 2010).

References

External links 
 Nicoll Russell Studios website 

Architecture firms of Scotland
Companies based in Dundee
Design companies established in 1982
1982 establishments in Scotland